Susanino is the name of several inhabited localities in Russia.

Urban localities
Susanino, Kostroma Oblast, an urban-type settlement in Susaninsky District of Kostroma Oblast

Rural localities
Susanino, Khabarovsk Krai, a selo in Ulchsky District of Khabarovsk Krai
Susanino, Leningrad Oblast, a logging depot settlement in Susaninskoye Settlement Municipal Formation of Gatchinsky District of Leningrad Oblast